The 2005 Kvalserien was the 31st edition of the Kvalserien. It determined two teams of the participating ones would play in the 2005–06 Elitserien season and which four teams would play in the 2005–06 HockeyAllsvenskan season.

Tournament

External links
Tournament on hockeyarchives.info

Kvalserien
Kval